McLaurin-Roper-McColl Farmstead, also known as Broad Oaks, is a historic home and farmstead located near Clio, Marlboro County, South Carolina.  The original section of the house was built about 1826, as a four-bay side-gable cottage. Additions were made to the structure about 1850 and 1899, with American Craftsman style modifications made in the 1920s.  Also on the property are an early outbuilding, African American cemetery, farm roads, and built landscape features such as drainage ditches.

It was listed on the National Register of Historic Places in 2012.

References

Houses completed in 1826
Houses on the National Register of Historic Places in South Carolina
National Register of Historic Places in Marlboro County, South Carolina
1826 establishments in South Carolina
Houses in Marlboro County, South Carolina